Jigsaw Rock Gut is a prominent gully  west of Margaret Hill on Rücker Ridge, in the Royal Society Range of Victoria Land, Antarctica. It was named by the New Zealand Geographic Board in 1994 following work in the area by a New Zealand Geological Survey field party, 1977–78. Intense and intricate folds interlock like a jigsaw puzzle in the marble wall forming the eastern side of this gully, suggesting the name.

References

Valleys of Victoria Land
Scott Coast